The 1995 Korea Cup was the 21st competition of Korea Cup. It was held from 3 to 12 June 1995, and was won by Ecuador for the first time.

Group stage

Group A

Group B

Knockout stage

Bracket

Semi-finals

Final

See also
Korea Cup
South Korea national football team results

References

External links
Korea Cup 1995 at RSSSF

1995